Busyhead is the debut studio album by American singer-songwriter Noah Kahan, released by Republic Records on June 14, 2019. The majority of the tracks on Busyhead were produced by New Zealand musician Joel Little.

Track listing

References

2019 debut albums
Republic Records albums
Albums produced by Joel Little
Albums produced by Sam de Jong